Bayonville is a commune in the Ardennes department in the Grand Est region of northern France.

The inhabitants of the commune are known as Bayonvillois or Bayonvilloises.

Geography
Bayonville is located some 40 km south by south-east of Charleville-Mézières and 15 km south-west of Stenay. Access to the commune is by the D12 road from Buzancy in the north-west which passes through the centre of the commune and the village and continues south-east to Bantheville - changing to the D15 at the departmental border. Another D15 comes from Tailly in the north-east and goes south through the commune and the village continuing to Imécourt in the south-west. The D55 goes south from the village to Landres-et-Saint-Georges. Apart from the village there are the hamlets of Chennery and Landreville. The commune is mostly farmland with some forest in the east and north.

The Agron river flows through the south-east of the commune from north-east to south-west where it continues a meandering path to join the Aire south-west of Saint-Juvin.  The Ruisseau du Wassieux flows south-west through the commune and continues south-west to join the Agron near Imécourt. The Furba rises in the north-east of the commune and flows south-west to join the Agron at Landreville.

Toponymy
Bayonville was attested in the Latinised form Baionis villa in 960. The derivation is undoubtedly from the "Domain of Baio", a Germanic personal name (cf. Bayonvillers)

Bayonville appears as Bayonville on the 1750 Cassini Map and the same on the 1790 version.

History
In 1828 the communes of Chennery and Landreville were merged with the commune of Bayonville. In 1864 Landreville had 80 inhabitants.

Administration

List of Successive Mayors

Demography
In 2017 the commune had 99 inhabitants.

Culture and heritage

Civil heritage
The Chateau of Landreville (1567) is registered as an historical monument. The interior decor (16th century) is registered as an historical object.

Religious heritage

Bayonville Church

Notable people linked to the commune
Claude-François de Maillard first Marquis of Landreville in 1760

See also
Communes of the Ardennes department

References

Communes of Ardennes (department)